The Mayors is a 2004 Nigerian drama film written, produced and directed by Dickson Iroegbu, and starring Richard Mofe-Damijo, Sam Dede, Segun Arinze and Mike Ezuruonye. The film won 5 awards at the maiden edition of the African Movie Academy Awards in 2005, including the awards for Best Picture, Best Screenplay, Best Director, Best Actor in a Lead Role and Best Support Actor.

Cast
Richard Mofe-Damijo
Sam Dede
Segun Arinze
Mike Ezuruonye

See also
 List of Nigerian films of 2004

References

External links

 

2004 films
English-language Nigerian films
2004 drama films
Nigerian drama films
Best Film Africa Movie Academy Award winners
2000s English-language films